Antaqucha (Quechua anta copper, qucha lake, "copper lake", Hispanicized spelling Antacocha) is a lake in Peru located in the Junín Region, Jauja Province, Canchayllo District. It belongs to the watershed of the Mantaro River.

See also
List of lakes in Peru

References

Lakes of Peru
Lakes of Junín Region